Azium may refer to:
 Dexamethasone, a steroid drug
 Sodium azide, a chemical used in airbags